Sophia of Sweden, also Sophie - also (Swedish): Sofia - may refer to (queens, then princesses, chronologically):

Sophia of Denmark, Queen consort of Sweden 1260
Sophia Magdalen, Queen consort of Sweden 1771
Sofia (legal spelling after 1900), Queen consort of Sweden 1872
Sophia, Swedish princess around 1214, daughter of King Eric "X", married Prince of Mecklenburg
Sophia, Princess of Sweden 1547 
Hedwig Sophia, often just Sophia, Princess of Sweden 1681
Sophia Albertina, Abbess of Quedlinburg, Princess of Sweden 1753
Sophia, Princess of Sweden 1801 
Sofia, Princess of Sweden 2015